The British nobility consists of the peerage and the gentry. The peerage is a legal system of largely hereditary titles, granted by the British sovereign. Under this system, only the senior family member bears a substantive title (duke, marquess, earl, viscount, baron). The gentry are generally untitled members of the upper classes, however, exceptions include baronets, knights, Scottish feudal barons and lairds.

The history of the Jews in Britain goes back to the reign of William the Conqueror. The first written record of Jewish settlement in England dates from 1070, although Jews may have lived there since Roman times. The Jewish presence continued until King Edward I's Edict of Expulsion in 1290. After the expulsion, there was no Jewish community (apart from individuals who practised Judaism secretly) until the rule of Oliver Cromwell. While Cromwell never officially readmitted Jews to Britain, a small colony of Sephardic Jews living in London was identified in 1656 and allowed to remain. The Jewish Naturalisation Act of 1753, an attempt to legalise the Jewish presence in Britain, remained in force for only a few months. In 1858, practising Jews were finally allowed to sit in Parliament after the passage of the Jews Relief Act, which was a significant step on the path to Jewish emancipation in the United Kingdom.

The first Jewish knight was Sir Solomon de Medina, knighted in 1700, with no further Jews being knighted until 1837, when Queen Victoria knighted Moses Montefiore. Four years later, Isaac Goldsmid was made a baronet, the first Jew to receive a hereditary title. In 1885, Nathan Rothschild, 1st Baron Rothschild, became the first Jew to receive a peerage title.

Peerage titles

Marquessates
Marquess of Reading
 Rufus Isaacs, 1st Marquess of Reading
Gerald Isaacs, 2nd Marquess of Reading
Michael Alfred Rufus Isaacs, 3rd Marquess of Reading
Simon Isaacs, 4th Marquess of Reading
Marquess of Cholmondeley
George Cholmondeley, 6th Marquess of Cholmondeley (Jewish mother)

Earldoms
Earl of Beaconsfield (extinct)
 Benjamin Disraeli, 1st Earl of Beaconsfield (converted out)
Earl of Rosebery and Midlothian
Harry Primrose, 6th Earl of Rosebery, 2nd Earl of Midlothian (Jewish mother)
Earl of Harewood
David Lascelles, 8th Earl of Harewood (Jewish mother)

Viscountcies

Viscount Burnham (extinct)
Harry Levy-Lawson, 1st Viscount Burnham
Viscount Bearsted
Marcus Samuel, 1st Viscount Bearsted
Walter Samuel, 2nd Viscount Bearsted
Marcus Samuel, 3rd Viscount Bearsted
Peter Samuel, 4th Viscount Bearsted
Nicholas Alan Samuel, 5th Viscount Bearsted
Viscount Samuel
Herbert Samuel, 1st Viscount Samuel
Edwin Samuel, 2nd Viscount Samuel
David Samuel, 3rd Viscount Samuel
Dan Samuel, 4th Viscount Samuel
Jonathan Samuel, 5th Viscount Samuel

Hereditary baronies

Extant

Baron Rothschild
Nathan Mayer Rothschild, 1st Baron Rothschild
Walter Rothschild, 2nd Baron Rothschild
Victor Rothschild, 3rd Baron Rothschild
Jacob Rothschild, 4th Baron Rothschild
Baron Burnham
Edward Levy-Lawson, 1st Baron Burnham
Harry Levy-Lawson, 2nd Baron Burnham, created Viscount Burnham
William Arnold Webster Levy-Lawson, 3rd Baron Burnham
Edward Lawson, 4th Baron Burnham
William Edward Harry Lawson, 5th Baron Burnham
Hugh Lawson, 6th Baron Burnham
Harry Frederick Alan Lawson, 7th Baron Burnham
Baron Swaythling
Samuel Montagu, 1st Baron Swaythling
Louis Montagu, 2nd Baron Swaythling
Stuart Albert Montagu, 3rd Baron Swaythling
David Montagu, 4th Baron Swaythling
Charles Montagu, 5th Baron Swaythling
Baron Mancroft
Arthur Samuel, 1st Baron Mancroft
Stormont Mancroft, 2nd Baron Mancroft
Benjamin Mancroft, 3rd Baron Mancroft
Baron Nathan
Harry Nathan, 1st Baron Nathan
Roger Nathan, 2nd Baron Nathan
Rupert Harry Bernard Nathan, 3rd Baron Nathan
Baron Silkin
Lewis Silkin, 1st Baron Silkin
Baron Marks of Broughton
Simon Marks, 1st Baron Marks of Broughton
Michael Marks, 2nd Baron Marks of Broughton
Simon Richard Marks, 3rd Baron Marks of Broughton

Extinct

Baron Eardley
Sampson Eardley, 1st Baron Eardley (Jewish father)
Baron Herschell
Farrer Herschell, 1st Baron Herschell (Jewish father)
Richard Herschell, 2nd Baron Herschell
Rognvald Herschell, 3rd Baron Herschell
Baron Wandsworth
Sydney Stern, 1st Baron Wandsworth
Baron Pirbright
Henry de Worms, 1st Baron Pirbright
Baron Michelham
Herbert Stern, 1st Baron Michelham
Herman Alfred Stern, 2nd Baron Michelham
Baron Jessel
Herbert Jessel, 1st Baron Jessel
Edward Jessel, 2nd Baron Jessel 
Baron Duveen
Joseph Duveen, 1st Baron Duveen
Baron Melchett
Alfred Mond, 1st Baron Melchett
Henry Mond, 2nd Baron Melchett
Julian Mond, 3rd Baron Melchett
Peter Mond, 4th Baron Melchett
Baron Hore-Belisha
Leslie Hore-Belisha, 1st Baron Hore-Belisha
Baron Conesford
Henry Strauss, 1st Baron Conesford
Baron Cohen of Birkenhead
Henry Cohen, 1st Baron Cohen of Birkenhead

Life peerages

 David Alliance, Baron Alliance
 Alexander Bernstein, Baron Bernstein of Craigweil
 Alma Birk, Baroness Birk
 Leon Brittan, Baron Brittan of Spennithorne
 Terence Etherton, Baron Etherton
 Andrew Feldman, Baron Feldman of Elstree
 Stanley Fink, Baron Fink
 David Freud, Baron Freud
 Dora Gaitskell, Baroness Gaitskell
 Robert Gavron, Baron Gavron
 Dean Godson, Baron Godson
 Peter Goldsmith, Baron Goldsmith 
 Arnold Goodman, Baron Goodman
 Anthony Grabiner, Baron Grabiner
 Susan Greenfield, Baroness Greenfield
 Richard Harrington, Baron Harrington of Watford
 Michael Howard, Baron Howard of Lympne
 Sydney Jacobson, Baron Jacobson
 Immanuel Jakobovits, Baron Jakobovits
 Keith Joseph, Baron Joseph
 Lawrence Kadoorie, Baron Kadoorie
 Nigel Lawson, Baron Lawson of Blaby
 Michael Levy, Baron Levy
 Peter Mandelson, Baron Mandelson (Jewish father)
 Yehudi Menuhin, Baron Menuhin
 Claus Moser, Baron Moser
 David Neuberger, Baron Neuberger of Abbotsbury
 Julia Neuberger, Baroness Neuberger
 Monroe Palmer, Baron Palmer of Childs Hill
 David Pannick, Baron Pannick
 Maurice Peston, Baron Peston of Mile End 
 Beatrice Plummer, Baroness Plummer 
 David Puttnam, Baron Puttnam (Jewish mother)
 Jonathan Sacks, Baron Sacks 
 Cyril Salmon, Baron Salmon
 James Sassoon, Baron Sassoon 
 Samuel Segal, Baron Segal 
 Beatrice Serota, Baroness Serota
 Emanuel Shinwell, Baron Shinwell
 Israel Sieff, Baron Sieff
 Marcus Sieff, Baron Sieff of Brimpton
 Samuel Silkin, Baron Silkin of Dulwich
 Alan Sugar, Baron Sugar
 David Triesman, Baron Triesman 
 Leslie Turnberg, Baron Turnberg
 Gordon Wasserman, Baron Wasserman
 Arnold Weinstock, Baron Weinstock
 Robert Winston, Baron Winston
 David Wolfson, Baron Wolfson of Sunningdale
 David Wolfson, Baron Wolfson of Tredegar
 Leonard Wolfson, Baron Wolfson
 Simon Wolfson, Baron Wolfson of Apsley Guise
 Harry Woolf, Baron Woolf 
 David Young, Baron Young of Graffham
 Solly Zuckerman, Baron Zuckerman

Other hereditary titles

Baronetcies

Extant

Lopes baronets of Maristow
Sir Manasseh Masseh Lopes, 1st Baronet (converted out)
Rothschild baronets of Grosvenor Place
Sir Anthony de Rothschild, 1st Baronet
Sir Nathan Rothschild, 2nd Baronet, created Baron Rothschild in 1885
Tuck baronets of Park Crescent
Sir Adolph Tuck, 1st Baronet
Sir William Reginald Tuck, 2nd Baronet
Sir Bruce Adolph Reginald Tuck, 3rd Baronet
Magnus baronets of Tangley Hill
Sir Philip Magnus, 1st Baronet
Sir Philip Magnus-Allcroft, 2nd Baronet
Cassel baronets of Lincoln's Inn
Sir Felix Maximilian Schoenbrunn Cassel, 1st Baronet
Sir Francis Edward Cassel, 2nd Baronet
Sir Harold Felix Cassel, 3rd Baronet
Sir Timothy Felix Harold Cassel, 4th Baronet
Joseph baronets of Portsoken
Sir Samuel Joseph, 1st Baronet
Sir Keith Joseph, 2nd Baronet, created a life peer in 1987

Extinct

Goldsmid baronets of St John's Lodge
Sir Isaac Goldsmid, 1st Baronet
Sir Francis Henry Goldsmid, 2nd Baronet
Sir Julian Goldsmid, 3rd Baronet
 Montefiore baronets of East Cliff Lodge
 Sir Moses Montefiore, 1st Baronet
 Goldsmid-Stern-Salomons baronets of Broom Hill
 Sir David Salomons, 1st Baronet
 Sir David Lionel Goldsmid-Stern-Salomons, 2nd Baronet
 Montefiore baronets of Worth Park
 Sir Francis Abraham Montefiore, 1st Baronet
Sassoon baronets of Kensington-gore and of Eastern-terrace
Sir Albert Abdullah David Sassoon, 1st Baronet 
Sir Edward Albert Sassoon, 2nd Baronet
Sir Philip Sassoon, 3rd Baronet
Speyer baronets of Grosvenor Street
Sir Edgar Speyer, 1st Baronet 
Sassoon baronets of Bombay
Sir Jacob Elias Sassoon, 1st Baronet
Sir Edward Elias Sassoon, 2nd Baronet
Sir Ellice Victor Sassoon, 3rd Baronet
Oppenheimer baronets of Stoke Poges
Sir Bernard Oppenheimer, 1st Baronet
Sir Michael Oppenheimer, 2nd Baronet
Sir Michael Bernard Grenville Oppenheimer, 3rd Baronet
Beit baronets of Tewin Water
Sir Otto Beit, 1st Baronet
Sir Alfred Beit, 2nd Baronet
D'Avigdor-Goldsmid baronets of Somerhill
Sir Osmond Elim d'Avigdor-Goldsmid, 1st Baronet 
Sir Henry Joseph d'Avigdor-Goldsmid, 2nd Baronet
Sir James Arthur d'Avigdor-Goldsmid, 3rd Baronet
Wolfson baronets of St. Marylebone
Sir Isaac Wolfson, 1st Baronet
Sir Leonard Wolfson, 2nd Baronet, created a life peer in 1985

Scottish feudal baronies
Barony of Craigie
Rabbi Robert Owen Thomas

Other non-hereditary titles

Judicial lordships
 John Dyson, Lord Dyson

Knighthoods

Sir Adolphe Abrahams
Sir Sidney Abrahams
Sir Ken Adam
Sir Victor Blank
Sir Leonard Blavatnik
Sir Ernest Cassel (converted out)
Sir Charles Clore
Sir Jack Cohen
Sir Solomon de Medina (knighted in 1700)
Sir Geoffrey Elton
Sir Jacob Epstein
Sir Clement Freud (converted out)
Sir Samuel Gluckstein
Sir James Goldsmith (Jewish father)
Sir Israel Gollancz
Sir Philip Green
Sir Basil Henriques
Sir George Henschel
Sir George Jessel
Sir Ellis Kadoorie
Sir Elly Kadoorie
Sir Horace Kadoorie
Sir Michael Kadoorie
Sir Nasser Khalili
Sir Ralph Kohn
Sir Ivan Lawrence
Sir Oliver Letwin
Sir Joseph Lyons
Sir Charles Mendl
Sir Sigismund Mendl
Sir Alan Mocatta
Sir Robert Mond
Sir Michael Moritz
Sir Stirling Moss (paternal grandfather was Jewish)
Sir Ernest Oppenheimer (converted out)
Sir Francis Palgrave
Sir Nikolaus Pevsner (converted out)
Sir Leslie Porter
Sir Malcolm Rifkind
Sir Tony Robinson
Sir William Rothenstein
Sir Isidore Salmon
Sir Samuel Isidore Salmon
Sir Harry Samuel
Sir Joseph Sebag-Montefiore
Sir Nicholas Serota
Sir Peter Shaffer
Sir Henry Slesser (converted out)
Sir Michael Sobell
Sir Georg Solti
Sir Tom Stoppard
Sir Geoffrey Vos
Sir Nicholas Winton (converted out)
Sir Henry Drummond Wolff

Honorary knighthoods

Daniel Barenboim, KBE
Michael Bloomberg, KBE
Lou Gerstner, KBE
Alan Greenspan, KBE
Sol Kerzner, KCMG
Henry Kissinger, KCMG
Ralph Lauren, KBE
André Previn, KBE
Arthur Rubinstein, KBE
Mortimer Sackler, KBE
Raymond Sackler, KBE
Steven Spielberg, KBE
James Wolfensohn, KBE

See also
Court Jew
History of the Jews in England
Jewish heraldry
List of European Jewish nobility

References

Citations

Sources

 Nobility
Nobility